The Bud Billiken Parade and Picnic (also known as The Bud Billiken Day Parade) is an annual parade held since 1929 in Chicago, Illinois. The Bud Billiken Day Parade is the largest African-American parade in the United States of America. Held annually on the city's south side on the second Saturday in August, the parade route travels on Dr. Martin Luther King Drive through the Bronzeville and Washington Park neighborhoods.  At the end of the parade, in the historic Washington public park is a picnic and festival.  Robert S. Abbott, the founder and publisher of the Chicago Defender, created the fictional character of Bud Billiken, which he featured in as youth advice column in his paper. David Kellum, co-founder of the Bud Billiken Club and longtime parade coordinator suggested the parade as a celebration of African-American life.

Since its beginning, the parade has featured celebrities, politicians, businessmen, civic organizations and youth. It is considered the second largest parade in the United States, whose focus is on celebrating youth, education and African-American life. The parade is also cited as the "back-to-school" celebration, marking the end of summer vacation and resuming of school for Chicago's youth.

History

Bud Billiken is a fictional character created in 1923 by Abbott, who had been considering adding a youth section to the Chicago Defender newspaper. While dining at a Chinese restaurant he noticed a Billiken. Some of the early Billiken columns were written by Willard Motley, who later became a prominent novelist. During the early 1930s, names of international youth were listed in the "Bud Billiken" section of the newspaper every week. Between 1930 and 1934, approximately 10,000 names appeared and were archived in the Carter G. Woodson Regional Library of the Chicago Public Library.

During the Great Depression, Abbott featured the Bud Billiken character in his newspaper as a symbol of pride, happiness and hope for black residents. The character gained prominence in a comic strip and the Chicago Defender newspaper. Although the character was created in 1923, the parade did not begin until 1929, when David Kellum initiated it as a celebration of the "unity in diversity for the children of Chicago". It has since grown to become a locally televised event and the second largest parade in the nation.

The parade, which began on August 10, 1929, now includes politicians, beauty queens, celebrities, musical performers, and dozens of marching, tumbling and dancing groups. It has grown from a locally sponsored event to one with major corporate presence and is seen as a signal of the impending end of summer and beginning of the new school year. As such the parade sponsors raise money for college scholarships for local youth. The parade route has changed over the years. The original route was along Michigan Avenue beginning at 31st Street, then turned east into Washington Park. Complaints for north–south traffic flow caused rerouting the parade route to South Parkway (now named Dr. Martin Luther King, Jr. Drive), which runs directly into the park. At various times, street repairs have necessitated use of the Michigan route, but the current route is now the King Drive route. Freeman Gosden and Charles Correll of Amos 'n' Andy were the first guests in the first parade. Robert S. Abbott led the first parade in his Rolls-Royce. Dr. Marjorie Stewart Joyner, president of the Chicago Defender Charities, Inc., organized the parade for over 50 years. Numerous high-profile celebrities and dignitaries have attended the parade over the years, including U.S. President Harry S. Truman, Michael Jordan, Barack Obama, Joe Louis, Muhammad Ali, Duke Ellington, Adelaide Hall, Oprah Winfrey, Aretha Franklin, Diana Ross, Lena Horne, James Brown, Ethel Waters, Cab Calloway, Paul Robeson, Chaka Khan and Billie Holiday. Truman rode alongside John H. Sengstacke, who was Abbott's nephew and took over the Chicago Defender in 1948, and Mayor Richard J. Daley in the 1956 Parade. Recent parades have featured popular musical acts as concert performers at the post-parade picnic. In 2006, approximately 26 million people saw the parade, including 25 million television viewers and 1.2 million attendees. The 2006 parade included 74,000 participants and 160 floats and vehicles. The 2008 parade was dedicated to actor and comedian  Bernie Mac (star of The Bernie Mac Show) and a native of Chicago; he died an hour before the start of the parade. In 1993, a request by a black LGBT group to participate in the parade was declined by the organizers. Following legal action and the involvement of Lambda Legal, the Ad Hoc Committee of Proud Black Lesbians and Gays was allowed to participate in the parade the following year. The 2020 parade, marking its 91st year, saw the first-ever cancellation, due to the COVID-19 pandemic. A "scaled down" event was held in 2021.

Parade

The parade has categorized contests for participants such as best float, and best marching band. It takes place in Chicago's Bronzeville neighborhood, starting at 35th Street
 and Dr. Martin Luther King Drive at the southern border of the Douglas community area, south of the landmark Victory Monument. It continues south to 55th Street in Washington Park. This route takes the parade through the Grand Boulevard and Washington Park community areas.

Grand Marshal
A notable person or persons are invited each year to serve as Grand Marshal, often featuring politicians, musicians, or entertainers. Chicago native Chance the Rapper served as the Grand Marshal for the 88th annual parade in 2017. Chicago native and singer Chaka Khan served as the Grand Marshal at the 2014 parade. Rapper T.I. served as Grand Marshal for the 83rd annual parade in 2012.

Theme
Bud Billiken Parade is themed every year by the parade committee. The tradition began in 1940 when the parade organizers themed the parade "Americanism" to demonstrate patriotism in the US within the African-American community. Other themes over the years:

Broadcast
The parade has been televised for over 40 years, beginning in 1978 on WGN-TV; which broadcast the parade until 2012. WCIU-TV covered the parade beginning in 2012 after it was canceled from WGN-TV but later canceled it in 2014. WLS-TV has been broadcasting the parade since 1984. The 89th Annual Parade took place on August 11, 2018. BET and Centric premiered the parade on their networks in 2012. On August 8, 2020, WLS-TV aired a television special for the 91st Annual Bud Billiken Parade in place of the 2020 parade which was canceled due to COVID-19 concerns.

After Parade Activities
The parade begins at 10 A.M. After the parade, visitors are welcomed to stay in Washington Park for the "after-parade-activities". The "after-parade-activities" has various festivities and vendor booths.  The post–parade festivities often include a concert. The 2006 parade featured Yung Joc, and the 2007 parade featured Pretty Ricky. However, it seems neither "after-parade-activities" included a concert.

Notable events

2003 concert
The 2003 parade featured B2K. The concert was free with virtually unlimited space in the park for viewing. However, the crowd became unruly causing the concert to be curtailed. Over 40 attendees were taken to hospitals as a result of injuries in the violence, including two teenagers who were shot.

2007 parade
At the 78th annual parade in 2007, then–U.S. Senator Barack Obama served as the Grand Marshal for the second year in a row. Chicago Mayor Richard M. Daley attended, and march participants included U.S. Senator Dick Durbin, Lieutenant Governor of Illinois Pat Quinn and the Rev. Al Sharpton. One float represented the Chicago 2016 Committee and included past Chicago Olympians Bob Pickens, Willie May, Diane Simpson-Bundy and Kenny Johnson as well as the son of Danell Nicholson. The Chicago Bulls' mascot made a guest appearance.

Restructuring
The Chicago Defender Charities underwent a major restructuring in 2017. Myiti Sengstacke–Rice is Board President of the Chicago Defender Charities and Bud Billiken Parade Chair. Sengstacke–Rice is the great-grandniece of Robert Sengstacke Abbott, granddaughter of John Herman Henry Sengstacke, founder of the Chicago Defender Charities and daughter of the late famed photojournalist, Robert Abbott Sengstacke.

See also
 Bud Billiken Club

References

External links

 Official site
 Encyclopedia of Chicago entry

African-American festivals
Festivals in Chicago
Parades in the United States
1929 establishments in Illinois